Po or PO may refer to:

Arts and entertainment

Fictional characters
 Po (Kung Fu Panda), the protagonist of the Kung Fu Panda franchise
 Po, one of the titular Teletubbies
 Po, a character in the novel Graceling by Kristin Cashore

Music
 Po (instrument), a percussion instrument
 Pocket Operator, a series of drum machines and synthesizers by Teenage Engineering
 Po!, a British musical group
 P.O., short for Pretty. Odd., an album by Panic! At the disco

Economics
 Purchase order, a document issued from a buyer to a seller
 Postal order, a financial instrument for sending money by mail
 Pareto optimality, a concept in economics
 Principal Only, a type of collateralized mortgage obligation
 Product owner, a popular role in Agile development methodology

Businesses and organisations
 Compagnie du chemin de fer de Paris à Orléans, a defunct French railway company, and one of the principal components of the SNCF
 Petrol Ofisi, a petroleum distribution company
 Pilkington Optronics, a multinational optronics manufacturer
 Polar Air Cargo (IATA code), an airline
 Platforma Obywatelska (Civic Platform), a Polish political party
 Post office, a customer service facility forming part of a national postal system
 Pensions Ombudsman, the official ombudsman institution for investigating complaints regarding pensions in the UK
 PhysicsOverflow, a post-publication open peer review platform and question & answer forum

Military ranks
 Petty officer, a non-commissioned naval rank
 Pilot officer, a commissioned air force rank

People
 Po Beg, 8th-century Turkic female ruler
 Fernão do Pó, 15th-century Portuguese explorer
 Kimberly Po (born 1971), US tennis player
 Teresa del Po (1649–1716), Italian painter
 P.O, stage name of Pyo Ji-hoon, South Korean rapper and member of the boy group Block B

Places

Europe
 Po (river), a river in Italy
 Pô (department), a department of the First French Empire in present Italy
 PO postcode area, a group of UK postal districts around Portsmouth, England
 Poo (Cabrales) (Asturian: Po), a municipality in Asturias, Spain

Other places
 Pô Department, a department and commune in Burkina Faso
 Pô, the village in this departement
 Po, Chiang Rai, a village in Thailand
 A river in Virginia, USA; joins the Mat, the Ta, and the Ni Rivers to form the Mattaponi River

Science, technology, and mathematics

Computing
 .po, a filename extension
 Petaoctet (Po), a unit of information storage
 Product owner, a role in Scrum, a software development strategy

Other uses in science, technology, and mathematics
 Polonium, symbol Po, a chemical element
 Propylene oxide, an organic compound
 Phosphorus monoxide (PO), an unstable radical inorganic compound
 Projective orthogonal group, an action in projective geometry and linear algebra
 Per os or peroral, meaning "by mouth", i.e. oral administration of a medication

Other uses
 Po (clothing), a traditional Korean overcoat
 Po (food), dried meat and fish in Korean cuisine
 Po (lateral thinking), part of a lateral thinking technique created by Edward de Bono
 Po (panda), son of Yang Yang, a giant panda at Zoo Atlanta
 Po (spirit), one of the elements of the spirit in ancient Chinese religion
 Po language, or Bo language, of New Guinea
 Chamber pot, in British slang
 Probation officer or parole officer
 Putout, in baseball statistics
 Po, the former name of the 2016 film A Boy Called Po

See also
 Pau (disambiguation)
 P0 (disambiguation)
 Poe (disambiguation)
 Portugal
 P.O. box

Unisex given names